A carroccio was a large four-wheeled wagon bearing the city signs around which the militia of the medieval communes gathered and fought. It was particularly common among the Lombard, Tuscan and, more generally, northern Italian municipalities. Later its use spread even outside Italy. It was the symbol of municipal autonomy. Priests celebrated Mass at the altar before the battle, and the trumpeters beside them encouraged the fighters to the fray.

Defended by selected troops, paved with the colors of the municipality, it was generally pulled by oxen and carried an altar, a bell (called "martinella"), the heraldic signs of the city and a mast surmounted by a Christian cross. In peace time it was kept in the main church of the city to which it belonged.

In battle the carroccio was surrounded by the bravest warriors in the army as the carroccio guard, and it served both as a rallying point and as the palladium of the city's honour; its capture by the enemy was regarded as an irretrievable defeat and humiliation.

History

Origins

The carroccio, which has Lombard origins, was initially used by Arimannia as a war chariot. Its function became purely symbolic, with the addition of the cross, of the city signs, of the altar and with its preservation in the main church of the city between 1037 and 1039 due to the Archbishop of Milan Aribert's use in one of the sieges that Conrad II, Holy Roman Emperor did on several occasions in Milan. The carroccio therefore, from a military means, became a purely political instrument. From Milan its use spread in many municipalities of northern Italy, in Tuscany and outside Italy, until the decline in the 14th century. Medieval documents show the carroccio called carochium, carozulum, carrocerum or carrocelum, while in the Milanese dialect of the time it was probably called caròcc or caròz. The carroccio was introduced by Heribert (Ariberto) for use as the military insignia of Milan. His many supporters adopted and spread the use of the insignia. It was soon adopted in Lombardy, Tuscany and Rome where it signified a militia aligned toward a defence of the Church.

Its diffusion extended to other Lombard cities, but this cannot be explained as a pure reproduction of the Milanese carroccio. Moreover, the descendants of the Arimannia, still at the turn of the 11th and 12th centuries had maintained, in the medieval society of northern Italy, a certain autonomy and were recognizable for various specific prerogatives, although the Lombard domination had ended after a few centuries.

12th century

Documents of 1158 and 1201 confirm the presence of the Milanese carroccio, in peacetime, in the church of San Giorgio al Palazzo, while others are still inside the Palazzo della Ragione. The first document cited contains information on the need to make an iron shield to be placed in the choir of the church, which was located near the carroccio, with the lighting of a votive fire fed by a pound of oil. The 1201 document contains similar information in that the archbishop of the San Giorgio al Palazzo church in Milan should have lighted votive lamps around the carroccio.

In 1159 the municipal troops of Brescia conquered the carroccio of the Cremona area during a battle. The cart was then carried in triumph between the streets of Brescia and was placed in the community church, with the "martinella" which was positioned on the civic tower of the city.

The carroccio was the protagonist in the battle of Legnano on 29 May 1176, during which it was defended, according to legend, by the Company of Death led by Alberto da Giussano, a fictional character who actually appeared only in literary works of the following century. According to the legend, during the fight, three doves, out of the burials of the saints Sisinnio, Martirio and Alessandro at the basilica of San Simpliciano in Milan, rested on the carroccio causing the flight of Frederick Barbarossa.

Instead, according to the real historical facts, the municipal infantry arranged a decisive resistance around the carroccio which allowed the remaining part of the Lombard League army led by Guido da Landriano, to arrive from Milan and defeat Frederick Barbarossa in the famous clash of Legnano. Today it is difficult to establish precisely the exact location of this carroccio to the current topography of Legnano. One of the chronicles of the clash, the Cologne Annals, contain important information:

This would suggest that the carroccio was located on the edge of a steep slope flanking the river Olona, so that the imperial cavalry, whose arrival was planned by Castellanza along the river, would have been forced to attack the centre of the army of the Lombard League going up the escarpment. This decision later proved to be strategically incorrect, given that Frederick Barbarossa came instead from Borsano, or from the opposite side, which forced the municipal troops to resist around the carroccio with the escape road blocked by the Olona.

Considering the evolution of the clash, this could mean that the crucial phases in defence of the carroccio had been fought on the territory of the San Martino contrada (more precisely, near the 15th-century church of the same name, which in fact dominates a slope that descends towards the Olona) or of the Legnanese quarter of "Costa di San Giorgio", since in another part of the  neighbouring areas it is not possible to identify another depression with the characteristics suitable for its defence. Considering the last hypothesis, the final clash could also have taken place on part of the territory now belonging to the contrade of Sant'Ambrogio and San Magno (between the quartier of "Costa di San Giorgio" and the Olona, a steep slope was later included in the Castello park) and to the municipality of San Giorgio su Legnano.

13th century
The carroccio was afterwards adopted by other cities and first appears, after Legnano, on a Florentine battlefield in 1228. The Florentine carroccio was usually followed by a smaller cart bearing the "martinella", a bell to ring out military signals. When war was regarded as likely, the "martinell" was attached to the door of the Church of Santa Maria in the Mercato Nuovo in Florence and rung to warn both citizens and enemies. In times of peace, the carroccio was in the keeping of a great family which had distinguished itself by signal services to the republic. The Florentine carroccio was captured by the Ghibelline forces of Castruccio Castracani in the 1325 Battle of Altopascio, after which it was displayed by the victors in a triumph held in the streets of Lucca.

The carro della guerra of Milan was described in detail in 1288 by Bonvesin de la Riva in his book on the "Marvels of Milan". Wrapped in scarlet cloth and drawn by three yoke of oxen that were caparisoned in the white with the red crosses of Saint George, the city's patron, it carried a crucifix so massive it took four men to put it in place, like a ship's mast.

The carroccio of the Lombard League was captured by the imperials in 1237 during the battle of Cortenuova, donated to Pope Gregory IX by the emperor Frederick II, Holy Roman Emperor, and transported to the Palazzo Senatorio in Rome in what is still called the Sala del carroccio ("Room of carroccio"), where the commemorative inscription of the gift is kept made by the emperor to the Roman people. The inscription reads:

Rome, in addition to being the seat of the papacy, was also the capital of a vast empire, and therefore the sending of the carroccio to the city by the emperor had a strong symbolic meaning. In 1237 however, the Lega Lombarda lost the carroccio in battle because of the muddy roads.

In 1275, it was the carroccio of the Bolognese (who were Guelphs) to be captured in the battle of San Procolo by the Forlivese, who were instead Ghibellines, and to be brought in triumph to Forlì. In the mid-13th century the carroccio di Cremona was instead captured in battle by the municipal militias of Parma.

Accounts of the carroccio will be found in most histories of the Italian republics.

14th century: decline and disappearance
The decline of the carroccio occurred due to the evolution of war tactics. When larger and more manoeuvrable armies began to appear, the municipal infantry were replaced by soldiers of "ventura", who, being mercenaries, lacked emotional ties and belonging to the city.

The symbolic value of the carroccio, in this historical context, was therefore less. Moreover, from a logistical point of view, the carroccio, being a very slow vehicle drawn by oxen, was not very mobile, and often created obstacles to the actions of war, which were becoming faster and faster. For these reasons, the carroccio, in the 14th century, went inexorably towards a phase of decline which then led to its disappearance from battlefields.

The use of the carroccio outside Italy
Similar cart-mounted standards were also found elsewhere in Europe, at the Battle of the Standard in 1138, employed by the English, and at the Battle of Sirmium in 1167, employed by the Hungarians. In addition, the carroccio was also used in the Battle of Bouvines in 1214.

Function
In addition to the symbolic value, the carroccio had an important military tactical function. It began to gain military value, especially after the battle of Legnano, where, between the first times in history, the infantry, which was gathered around the carroccio, held the chivalry head. Until then, the latter was in fact considered clearly superior to soldiers on foot.

Since the infantry gathered around the carroccio, the latter, besides having a strong symbolic value, therefore had an important tactical function. If the carroccio was ever captured, for the municipal militias, defeat was almost certain. Also, for this reason, the carroccio, in addition to being considered the most coveted in war, was kept in cathedrals, which were the most important churches of the municipalities, and was the protagonist, always in times of peace, of the most important ceremonies and events that took place in the cities.

In addition to the war purpose, the carroccio had other functions, which could also be carried out in times of peace. The leaders of the municipalities, on the carroccio, could make important decisions concerning the city, while the judges could use it as a mobile tribunal to issue their sentences.

The Lombard Lega infantry, during the battle of Legnano, managed to resist the various attacks perpetrated by the imperial cavalry due to the tactics of the latter, which foresaw assaults on small disorganized groups. Only after the clash of Legnano did the cavalry begin to change strategy, attacking the infantry in defence of the carroccio in conspicuous organized forces, thus succeeding in breaking its resistance. This change in war strategy also contributed to the decline and disappearance of the carroccio from battlefields.

Description

The remains that survived

In Brescia, there is a cross that probably belonged to the flagpole of the carroccio from Cremona, conquered in 1191 at the battle of the Malamorte. Inside the Siena Cathedral, on the other hand, two large 10–15 m spars are preserved, which traditionally refers to the carroccio, victorious from the battle of Montaperti. In Cremona, at the civic museum, there is a wooden platform that is thought to have belonged to the cart of the wagon taken from the Milanese in 1213 in Castelleone.

In the chronicles
Since there are very few surviving remains from medieval times, information on the shape of the carroccio is fragmentary. Alessandro Visconti, in a book from 1945, referring to the chronicler Arnulf of Milan, reports this description:

Two depictions of the carroccio in the Middle Ages reached the 21st-century ichnographically. The first is present in the Montauri Chronicles of Siena, and the second in the Chronicle of Giovanni Villani. The two representations are the result of stories by non-ocular chroniclers, being the authors of the 14th and 15th centuries, therefore of an era where the presence of the carroccio in everyday life had by then disappeared.

The first representation shows only two movable flagpoles, one with the help of the other, while in the second image, where there is a four-wheeled cart with a flag, the subject is shown in more detail. The same image of the carroccio is present in a fresco by Stradanus dedicated to the House of Medici, which depicts Piazza della Signoria during the feast of John the Baptist.

It is therefore probable that three types of carroccio existed. The first "classic" on the Milanese model, the Tuscan one with two flagpoles (with the carroccio of Florence that presented a bell), and the one widespread in Flanders and Germany, which was a simple cart with a central flagpole.

From the description, made by Salimbene di Adam, of the dismantling of the one captured by the Parmesans to the Cremonese during the Battle of Parma in 1248, it can be deduced that there were five parts of the carroccio: four wheels, a platform, the flagpole, the flag and various decorations. The wheels were very large, and were usually painted red in Milan and Florence, white in Parma, and in precious colours not specified in Siena and Padua.

The flagpole, according to the description of Bonvesin da la Riva, weighed as much as four men and was usually supported by ropes (certainly that of Milan). In the Chigi codex, the Florentine carroccio presents two flagpoles and the flag, which very often was not fixed to a sidebar, was in precious fabric usually divided into two halved colours, or it was decorated with a cross motif. Unlike in Northern Europe, the representation of the patron saint did not appear on Italian wagons, where it was often depicted as decoration of the front body.

The tow of the carroccio was usually executed by oxen or — very rarely — by horses.

The "martinella"

The use of the bell (the "martinella") is still controversial. It is not clear whether he was directly on the carroccio or else he followed on another vehicle. The function of recall of the soldiers around the carroccio was carried out by the "martinella", while the trumpeters imparted the orders and, very often, incited the troop to the combat.

In 2000, the original "martinella" of the Battle of Legnano was identified. It was kept on the bell tower of the hermitage of Sant'Alberto di Butrio of Ponte Nizza, in the province of Pavia. In the same year of the discovery, it was paraded during the historical procession of the Palio di Legnano.

The specialis magister
The specialis magister, who took care of the maintenance of the carroccio, was paid by the municipality, for his service, 8 soldi a day. In addition to checking the functionality of the wagon, the specialis magister participated in the war actions in which the carroccio was involved by dressing armor and carrying a sword.

On the carroccio, a chaplain was also present, whose function was to celebrate Mass on the altar placed on the carroccio. Also this religious figure, together with that of the cleric, was paid by the municipality.

In literature
The first literary trace of the carroccio appears in the poem by Raimbaut de Vaqueiras, a French troubadour of the 12th century, entitled "Il Carros", where the man of letters, turning his flattery to Beatrice, daughter of Boniface I, Marquess of Montferrat, states that the Lombard women rivals in the beauty of the girl they use a carroccio and other chariots to "fight" the growing fame of the girl.

Giacomo da Lentini, an imperial official of Frederick II, Holy Roman Emperor, dealt with the carroccio in the song Ben m'è venuto, which is a poetic piece of love inspired by the poems of the troubadours and probably composed before the battle of Cortenuova (between 1233 and 1237).

The carroccio in the modern era

Posthumous meaning

Since the carroccio is a signum, in modern times it has become a symbol of ideas, hopes and different meanings, very often as anti-tyrannical propaganda during the period of the Signorias, up to Romanticism and the Risorgimento, where it became the symbol of the struggle against the foreign occupation. Important promoters of these ideas were Massimo d'Azeglio, Giovanni Berchet, Amos Cassioli, Francesco Hayez.

Giosuè Carducci and Giovanni Pascoli recalled, with the Canzone di Legnano and Canzone del carroccio, the splendors of medieval Italian comunes, a concept that was later taken up also by the writings of Gabriele D'Annunzio.

Commemorations
In festivals and historical re-enactments, very often, the pivotal figure is represented by the carroccio:

In the Palio di Siena (2 July – 16 August) the carroccio, which parades with the black-and-white sock of the municipality, carries the Palio (also known as "cencio"), or a painted silk drapery, prize of the horse race (called also "carriera") which closes the event. The bell and the heralds represent the final moment of the Corteo Storico, before the carriera for the conquest of the rag.
In the Palio di Legnano (last Sunday of May), the carroccio parades through the streets of Legnano pulled by oxen. This wagon, which concludes the historical procession, carries the Cross of Aribert, the coveted prize of the horse race in which the eight contrade in which Legnano is divided compete in the stadio Giovanni Mari. The carroccio, during the historical procession, which closes at the Giovanni Mari stadium, is escorted by some figurants who impersonate Alberto da Giussano and the Company of Death. The latter, before the horse race, recall the charge made, according to legend, by the Company of Death and Alberto da Giussano during the battle of Legnano.
In the Palio di Asti (third Sunday of September), the carroccio is pulled by three pairs of oxen and brings, as tradition dictates, the insignia of the city (a white cross on a red field), a wrought iron rooster (symbol of municipal freedom), and the Palio di Asti, the coveted prize of the winner of the horse race. It is a historical reconstruction of the medieval Asti carroccio and bears the altar with a reproduction of Secundus of Asti, present in the Gothic choir of the Asti Cathedral. On the carroccio di Asti there is also the "martinella", or the bell that once served to call the municipal troops to pray before the battle. It is kept in the Collegiate Church of San Secondo, from which it comes out only once a year, on the occasion of the Palio race, on the third Sunday of September.

Modern uses of the term
The political party of the Lega Nord is historically known as il carroccio, in reference to the Battle of Legnano to which the Lega Nord symbolism refers.

See also
Alberto da Giussano
Battle of Legnano
Company of Death
Lombard League

Citations

References

 (In Italian) Giorgio D'Ilario, Egidio Gianazza, Augusto Marinoni, Legnano e la battaglia, Edizioni Landoni, 1976.
 (In Italian) Gabriella Ferrarini, Marco Stadiotti, Legnano una città, la sua storia, la sua anima, Telesio editore, 2001.
 (In Italian) Chiara Frugoni, Il Villani illustrato : Firenze e l'Italia medievale nelle 253 immagini del ms. Chigiano L VIII 296 della Biblioteca Vaticana, texts by Alessandro Barbero, Alessandro Savorelli to others, Firenze, Le lettere, 2005.
 (In Italian) Paolo Grillo, Legnano 1176. Una battaglia per la libertà, Laterza, 2010.
 (In Latin) Alphonse Huillard-Bréholles, Tomus 5, pars 1, part of Historia diplomatica Friderici secundi, Anastatic reprint. of edition: Parisiis Henricus Plon, Torino, Bottega d'Erasmo, 1963 [1857].
 (In Italian) Augusto Marinoni, La battaglia di Legnano è avvenuta nel territorio sangiorgese?, in Attilio Agnoletto, San Giorgio su Legnano - storia, società, ambiente, Edizioni Landoni, 1992.
 (In Italian) Cesare Paoli, Il libro di Montaperti : (an. 1260), Firenze, G. P. Vieusseux, 1889.
 (In German) H. Zug Tucci, Il carroccio, in Quellen und Forschungen aus italienischen Bibliotheken und Archiven, vol. 65, 1985, pp. 1–104.
 (In Italian) Guglielmo Ventura, Memoriale, by Ludovico Antonio Muratori, Milano, 1727.
 (In Italian) Ernst Voltmer, Il carroccio, translation of Giuseppe Albertoni, Torino, Einaudi, 1994.

External links

Carts

Chariots